Zhuravka is a rural locality (a khutor) in Verkhnegnutovskoye Rural Settlement, Chernyshkovsky District, Volgograd Oblast, Russia. The population was 96 as of 2010.

Geography 
Zhuravka is located on the Don Plain, on the Tsimla River, 15 km southeast of Chernyshkovsky (the district's administrative centre) by road. Yolkino is the nearest rural locality.

References 

Rural localities in Chernyshkovsky District